The 2010 season was Malmö FF's 99th in existence, their 75th season in Allsvenskan and their 10th consecutive season in the league. They competed in Allsvenskan where they finished in 1st position and Svenska Cupen where they were knocked out in the fourth round. The club celebrated its 100th anniversary during the season, a pre-season training match against IF Elfsborg was played on the exact day, 24 February 2010. The club won Allsvenskan in the last round in the home game against Mjällby AIF on 7 November which Malmö FF won 2–0. The season was Roland Nilssons last full season as Malmö FF manager as he left the club during the 2011 season.

Players

Squad

Players in/out

In

Out

Squad stats

Disciplinary record

.

Club

Coaching staff

Other information

Competitions

Overall

Allsvenskan

League table

Results summary

Results by round

Matches
Kickoff times are in CET.

Svenska Cupen

Kickoff times are in CET.

Non competitive

Pre-season

Mid-season

Malmö FF seasons
Malmo FF
Swedish football championship-winning seasons